Harpagomantis is a genus of praying mantises in the family Galinthiadidae found in Africa. It is monotypic, being represented by the single species Harpagomantis tricolor.

See also
List of mantis genera and species
Flower mantis

References

 
Mantodea genera
Galinthiadidae